Gilbert Valliant Byron (July 12, 1903 – June 25, 1991) was an American writer, best known for his poems, short stories, novels, historical research, magazine and newspaper columns and articles detailing life on the Chesapeake Bay throughout the 20th century. Byron, who was born in Chestertown, Maryland on July 12, 1903, is sometimes referred to as "The Voice of the Chesapeake" and as "the Chesapeake Thoreau," because he shares the same birth date with Walden Pond's Henry David Thoreau. Gilbert Byron died shortly before his 88th birthday on June 25, 1991.

During his lifetime, Byron had published 14 books and over 70 short stories, poems, and articles. His books and poems, including The Lord's Oysters, Done Crabbin', and These Chesapeake Men, make up what is likely the largest collection of written works on the Chesapeake Bay area authored by one person. Byron lived on the Eastern Shore of the Bay nearly all of his life, and the log cabin where he resided for 45 years of his life was saved from destruction and ultimately preserved at Pickering Creek in Easton, Maryland.  The Gilbert Bryon Society was founded in 1991 to cultivate an awareness and appreciation of the Chesapeake Bay region's literature in particular, and the environment in general, through the works and legacy of Gilbert Bryon.

Byron's biography, "Gilbert Byron - A Life Worth Examining," was published in 2015 by the Talbot County Free Library, Easton, Maryland

References

External links
pickeringcreek.org
www.lewestown.com/lewes_history/gilbert.html
The Gilbert Byron Society

20th-century American poets
1903 births
1991 deaths
Novelists from Maryland
20th-century American novelists
People from Chestertown, Maryland
People from Easton, Maryland
American male novelists
American male poets
20th-century American male writers